Scopula defectiscripta is a moth of the  family Geometridae. It is found in Taiwan.

References

Moths described in 1914
defectiscripta
Moths of Taiwan